Easy Street Records is an independent record store located in Seattle, Washington. Easy Street opened its store in West Seattle in 1988, and later added a cafe/bar, which serves coffee, breakfast, lunch, beer and wine. Easy Street Records often hosts live in-store performances by national and local musicians. The store carries new and used CDs, vinyl records, DVDs, new books, magazines and company-branded merchandise. In 2018, Rolling Stone named Easy Street one of the ten best record stores in the US. The publication also included the store in its 2010 article "Best Record Stores In the USA". Time magazine featured the store in its article "10 Great American Record Shops" On October 10, 2012, Easy Street was named King County's "Best Small Business" in the 2nd annual King County Executive's Small Business Awards. In November 2012, Seattle mayor Mike McGinn "recognized Easy Street Records for their stability, longevity, and involvement in Seattle's music community, while embodying Seattle's pioneering spirit and reflecting Seattle at its best." In 2017, the Travel Channel named Easy Street one of "Eight Must-Visit American Record Stores". Easy Street is a member of the Coalition of Independent Music Stores (CIMS).

History

Owner/President Matt Vaughan worked at two record stores during his teen years. In 1987, with both stores ready to go out of business simultaneously, Vaughan approached both owners and offered to consolidate the two stores into one. Vaughan opened Easy Street Records in the business district of West Seattle (known as "The Junction") in 1988 and the following year moved the store to its current location on the primary corner of the Junction in the historic Hamm Building. In 1999, he leased the space next door (previously Joe's Grill), installed a new kitchen and bar, and by 2001 had opened a full-service cafe. The following year he opened a second, much larger store in the Queen Anne neighborhood.

In-store performances

The larger store provided the extra room Vaughan needed to build a stage and soon national touring artists began performing there, including Lou Reed, Elvis Costello, Kings of Leon, Patti Smith, Paul Westerberg, Franz Ferdinand, Lana Del Rey, Dierks Bentley, Robyn, Jack Johnson,  Jurassic 5, Wanda Jackson, Steve Earle, Regina Spektor, John Doe, Dick Dale, My Morning Jacket and many others. Easy Street is a strong supporter of Northwest artists, and has hosted in-store performances by Mudhoney, the Shins, Macklemore & Ryan Lewis, the Cave Singers, Brandi Carlile, Shabazz Palaces, the Moondoggies, Damien Jurado, Presidents of the USA, Minus the Bear, Band of Horses, the Head & the Heart and Blue Scholars, to name but a few. To date, the two stores combined have hosted over 500 in-store performances.

Live At Easy Street

On April 25, 2005, Easy Street was chosen to host the national ten-year anniversary conference for CIMS (the Coalition of Independent Music Stores), an independent record retailers convention and Pearl Jam guitarist Mike McCready felt the band could do something special as a "thank you" gesture to these retailers. Vaughan proposed a surprise, invite-only in-store performance at the intimate West Seattle location. During one of several meetings with the band's management about logistics, Pearl Jam singer Eddie Vedder showed up and stated his desire to make it work, and the show was confirmed soon after. On April 29, the retailers were bussed to the West Seattle store for what was described as a "work party". The band appeared, much to everyone's surprise, and proceeded to play a special set for the crowd of 200. Pearl Jam later decided to release a special EP of the highlights from the show. Titled Live at Easy Street, its two pressings have completely sold out, and it is the store's biggest selling record to date.

Two other artists have released EPs recorded at Easy Street. Brandi Carlile's Live at Easy Street Records was released in 2007 and Gov't Mule's Mule on Easy Street (now out of print) in 2006. In addition, several artists have recorded their in-store performances for radio broadcasts, including Elvis Costello, the Shins, My Morning Jacket and Brad.

Queen Anne Store closure

On January 2, 2013, owner Matt Vaughan announced the closure of Easy Street's Queen Anne store, effective January 18, 2013. Vaughan cited a significant increase in rent as the primary reason for the closure. In his statement Vaughan added that Chase Bank would be the new tenant. On closing night, Yo La Tengo played to a packed house for the final in-store at the Queen Anne location.

The Sonics (And Guests) At Easy Street

On April 18, 2015, Easy Street presented a special Record Store Day in-store performance by the legendary Northwest band, the Sonics, who had just released their first album in nearly 40 years, This Is The Sonics. Tickets went on sale the day before the event, with all proceeds going toward funding Seattle radio station KEXP's move to larger headquarters at the Seattle Center. The event was billed as the Sonics (and Special Guests), which raised a great deal of speculation and excitement about who the guests would be. At 10 pm on Record Store Day, with the store packed to capacity, the Sonics took the stage, and as night went on, they welcomed Pearl Jam's Eddie Vedder and Mike McCready, Chris Ballew (Presidents of the USA), Ben Shepherd (Soundgarden), Van Conner & Mark Pickerel (Screaming Trees), original Sonics bassist Andy Parypa, Calvin Johnson (Beat Happening), Matt Lukin (Mudhoney), Emily Nokes (Tacocat), Bill "Kahuna" Henderson (Girl Trouble), and Rod Moody (Swallow). KEXP recorded and filmed the entire event, and the album The Sonics Live At Easy Street was released on vinyl April 16, 2016.

Sasquatch! Music Festival 
From 2003 to 2018 Easy Street was the exclusive retailer for the Sasquatch! Music Festival, which took place every Memorial Day weekend in George, Washington. Each year the Easy Street Sasquatch! booth hosted signing sessions with many of the festival's top performers. Sasquatch! helped launch many of the region's most famed artists.

The Cafe
The Cafe, located next door to the Easy Street West Seattle store, opened as a full-service dining space in 2001. Before that it served as a walkup coffee bar and provided space for in-store performances. It is among the most popular brunch destinations in Seattle, serving a large selection of music-themed menu items (e.g., James Browns, Dolly Parton Stack, Johnny Cash Special, Notorious B&G, Soundgarden Burger). The cafe is also a popular choice for "grab-n-go" espresso drinks and beer is also available (which customers can take with them while shopping in the store). In March 2012 the Seattle Metropolitan magazine added the cafe to their "Breakfast Hall of Fame". In December 2017 it was also featured in an episode of the Travel Channel's Man v. Food, hosted by Casey Webb.

Murals
Easy Street is well known for its large eye-catching hand-painted murals of album covers on its stores' exterior walls. The murals are regularly updated with covers of the most recent music releases.

References

External links
 
 

Music of Seattle